Rachel Mae Arnold (born 16 April 1996) is a Malaysian female squash player represents Malaysia women's national squash team. She is the younger sister of a fellow Malaysian squash player, Delia Arnold.

Career
Rachel started her squash international career in 2016 and reached the world ranking of 64 by the end of 2016. She reached her career best world ratings in December 2017 after winning the Malaysian Open Squash Championships singles in May 2017. Rachel Arnold also won the women's singles at the SEA Games Championship in 2017. Rachel also competed at the 2014 Commonwealth Games. Currently ranked 43rd in the world, based on PSA rank.

In 2022, she won a bronze at the 2022 Women's World Team Squash Championships.

References

External links 
 
 
 
 
 

1996 births
Living people
Malaysian female squash players
Sportspeople from Kuala Lumpur
Malaysian people of Chinese descent
Commonwealth Games competitors for Malaysia
Squash players at the 2014 Commonwealth Games
Squash players at the 2018 Commonwealth Games
Southeast Asian Games medalists in squash
Southeast Asian Games gold medalists for Malaysia
Competitors at the 2017 Southeast Asian Games
Competitors at the 2019 Southeast Asian Games
Competitors at the 2017 World Games
21st-century Malaysian women